Hugh Arfon Evans (1913-1995) was a Welsh, Anglican priest.

Evans was educated at   St David's College, Lampeter and St Michael's College, Llandaff. He was ordained deacon in 1936 and priest in 1937. He was
Vicar of Llanfair-is-gaer from 1952 to 1973; and Treasurer of Bangor Cathedral from 1966 to 1973. He was Archdeacon of Bangor from 1973 to 1983.

References

1913 births
Archdeacons of Bangor
20th-century Welsh Anglican priests
Alumni of the University of Wales, Lampeter
1995 deaths
Alumni of St Michael's College, Llandaff